The Best of Me is the third greatest hits album by Canadian singer Bryan Adams. It was released worldwide in 1999, and in the U.S. in 2001. It was his last release on A&M Records. Upon its initial release, a special edition 2-disc set was issued with live tracks. Another special edition 2-CD set was issued when the album was released in the U.S., dubbed 'Special Tour Edition', bearing three extra tracks. It is Adams' second compilation album, after So Far So Good; except for Japan, where Hits on Fire was released in 1988. The album contains songs from Reckless (1984) to On a Day Like Today (1998), omitting Into the Fire (1987). This album sees Adams reuniting with Robert John "Mutt" Lange – on the (new) title track – after being absent from 1998's On a Day Like Today.

Track listing

1999 special edition bonus disc
 "Summer of '69" (Live from South Africa) – 3:34
 "Back to You" (Live from South Africa) – 5:28
 "Can't Stop This Thing We Started" (Live from South Africa) – 5:12
 "Have You Ever Really Loved a Woman?" (Live from South Africa) – 4:52
 "Rock Steady" (Live from South Africa) – 5:23

Tracks 2, 5 are also available on the single "Inside Out", issued in 2000.

2002 special tour edition bonus disc
 "Summer of '69" (Live from South Africa) – 3:34
 "Back to You" (Live from South Africa) – 5:28
 "Can't Stop This Thing We Started" (Live from South Africa) – 5:12
 "Have You Ever Really Loved a Woman?" (Live from South Africa) – 4:52
 "Rock Steady" (Live from South Africa) – 5:23
 "Cloud Number Nine" (Live at Slane Castle) – 4:09
 "I'm Ready" (Live at Slane Castle) – 4:34
 "Cuts Like a Knife" (Live at Slane Castle) – 6:02

This is basically the same bonus disc as the 1999 special edition release, with three extra tracks added.
Tracks 2, 5 are also available on the single "Inside Out", issued in 2000.
Tracks 6, 7, 8 are from the DVD release Live at Slane Castle.

Alternate and iTunes edition

An alternate edition of this CD, dated 1999 and carrying a sticker bearing the catalogue number 490 522-2 [11], omits the final track listed above, "18 Til I Die", and instead adds a hidden track after track 15:

16. "Don't Give Up" – 3:42, by Chicane featuring Bryan Adams, written by Nick Bracegirdle, Bryan Adams, and Ray Hedges.

No bonus disc is included with this edition.

This version of the album was previously available to download on iTunes but has since been removed

Personnel 
 Bryan Adams – vocals, bass guitar, producer, arranger
 Robert John "Mutt" Lange – producer
 Phil Western – engineer
 Greg Goldman – engineer
 Zach Blackstone – engineer
 Bob Clearmountain – mixing, producer
 Phil Thornalley – guitar
 Patrick Leonard – producer, arranger
 Danny Cummings – drums, percussion
 Chris Thomas – producer
 David Nicholas – producer, mixing
 Jim Vallance – producer
 Bob Rock – producer
 Melanie C – vocals on "When You're Gone"
 Jody Perpick – recording engineer
 Mickey Curry – drums, background vocals
 Keith Scott – guitar, background vocals

Charts

Weekly charts

Year-end charts

Certifications

References 

1999 greatest hits albums
Bryan Adams albums
Albums produced by Robert John "Mutt" Lange
A&M Records compilation albums